Podhorie (until 1899 ) is a village and municipality in Žilina District in the Žilina Region of northern Slovakia.

History
In historical records the village was first mentioned in 1393.

Geography
The municipality lies at an altitude of 460 metres and covers an area of 6.416 km2. It has a population of about 765 people.

External links
http://www.statistics.sk/mosmis/eng/run.html

Villages and municipalities in Žilina District